Alexander Thomson BSC (12 January 1929 – 14 June 2007) was a British cinematographer.

Biography
Born in London, England, he was first offered a job by Bert Easey (1901-1973), who was head of cameras at Denham and Pinewood Studios. He was nominated for the Academy Award for Best Cinematography for Excalibur (1981).

His other films included Year of the Dragon (1985), Legend (1985), Labyrinth (1986), The Krays (1990), Alien 3 (1992), Cliffhanger (1993), Demolition Man (1993), Executive Decision (1996) and two of Kenneth Branagh's Shakespeare adaptations, Hamlet (1996) and Love's Labour's Lost (2000).

After beginning his film career in the late 1940s, he went on to serve as a camera operator under cinematographer Nicolas Roeg on twelve films between 1961 and 1966. In 1998 he shot the Royal Premiered CinemaScope short "The Troop" (dir: Marcus Dillistone) An interview with Alex Thomson appears in a new book Conversations with Cinematographers by David A Ellis, published by Scarecrow Press.

Thomson died on 14 June 2007, at the age of 78, in Chertsey, Surrey.

Filmography

References

External links

1929 births
2007 deaths
Artists from London
British cinematographers